Irina Borisovna Zenovka (née Lebedeva; born September 2, 1972 in Moscow, RSFSR, USSR) is a Russian choreographer who choreographs for the Russian National team in rhythmic gymnastics.

Coaching career 
Zenovka along with Veronica Shatkova, she choreographs programs for most of Russia's National Team in Group and Individual rhythmic gymnasts. She has also choreographed for other international clients: the Israeli Group, USA, Greek, Swedish and Japanese rhythmic gymnasts.

Personal life 
Irina is married to Eduard Zenovka, an Olympic medalist in Modern pentathlon in 1992 and 1996.

Notable clients 
Zenovka has choreographed routines for:

 Evgenia Kanaeva 
 Daria Dmitrieva 
 Margarita Mamun 
 Dina Averina
 Arina Averina
 Aliya Garayeva
 Sakura Hayakawa
 Kaho Minagawa
 Jasmine Kerber
 Varvara Filiou
 Son Yeon-Jae
 Laura Zeng
 Sumire Kita

References

External links
 Irina Zenovka
 
 Rhythmic Gymnastics Results

1972 births
Living people
Russian gymnastics coaches
Sportspeople from Moscow